Give Us This Day is a 1949 British film, directed by Edward Dmytryk. This film was released in the United States as Christ in Concrete. Another alternate title was Salt to the Devil.

The film was based on the 1939 novel Christ in Concrete by Pietro Di Donato. The title is taken from the Lord's Prayer.

Plot
Geremio is an Italian bricklayer living with his family. The film depicts how Geremio and his family endure the struggles of living in Brooklyn during the Great Depression.

Cast
Sam Wanamaker.....Geremio
Lea Padovani.....Annunziata
Kathleen Ryan.....Kathleen
Charles Goldner.....Luigi
Bonar Colleano.....Giulio
William Sylvester.....Giovanni
George Pastell.....The Lucy (as Nino Pastellides)
Philo Hauser.....Head of Pig
Sid James.....Murdin
Karel Stepanek.....Jaroslav
Ina De La Haye.....Dame Catarina
Rosalie Crutchley.....Giulio's wife

Production

Red Scare
At the time this movie was made, Dmytryk had been blacklisted as a member of the Hollywood Ten. Wanamaker had also been blacklisted. The movie was filmed entirely in London due to this.

Reception
The film received a mixed review from New York Times film critic Bosley Crowther. He called it "a film drama of considerable graphicness but of oddly limited power." While praising the movie for its "careful and earnest attempt to capture the hard yet wistful quality of Mr. di Donato's tale", Crowther said that "the spirit and compulsion of this deeply distressing tale of poverty and frustration are absent from the film."

The film was a commercial failure in America.

References

External links
 
 
 

1949 films
British drama films
1949 drama films
Films directed by Edward Dmytryk
British black-and-white films
Eagle-Lion Films films
Films scored by Benjamin Frankel
Films set in Brooklyn
British films set in New York City
Films with screenplays by Hans Székely
1940s English-language films
1940s British films